John Mansbridge may refer to:

 John Mansbridge (artist) (1901–1981), British artist
 John B. Mansbridge (1917–2016), American art director